Nectarios Kellis was an Australian Greek Orthodox priest who embarked on a mission in Madagascar in the 1990s, and eventually became the Greek Orthodox Bishop of Madagascar. He was inspired by an appeal in a church magazine for missionaries to revive the Eastern Orthodox Church in Madagascar. There had been two Eastern Orthodox Churches in the country, mostly supported by Greek expatriates, but a military coup in 1972 had resulted in the expulsion of the clergy.

Nectarios pleaded with his bishop (the Bishop of Adelaide) to let him go to Madagascar, but the bishop at first refused, saying that he was too useful to him where he was. Eventually, however, the bishop relented, saying that he knew Nectarios would just be miserable if he were forced to stay.

Nectarios made contact with the publisher of the Greek magazine that contained the appeal, and asked who had written it, and was rather taken aback to learn that it was not an appeal from Eastern Orthodox Christians in Madagascar asking for a priest, but that the publisher himself had thought it would be a good idea. Nectarios realised that it would be pioneering missionary work.

Nevertheless, he went to Madagascar, which is part of the Greek Patriarchate of Alexandria and All Africa. He made contact with the families who were looking after the church buildings, and took the son of one of the families with him on his missionary journeys, travelling around the island to villages where there seemed to be no churches, and arranging with the headman of the village to preach the gospel there if anyone was interested. In this way he established several parishes. He sent the young man who had first accompanied him to the theological seminary in Nairobi, and established a school and an orphanage.

Death 
On 11 September 2004 he was killed in a helicopter crash along with Petros VII, Pope and Patriarch of Alexandria and all Africa, and several other clergy.

See also
 Eastern Orthodoxy in Madagascar

References

Eastern Orthodoxy in Madagascar
Eastern Orthodox Christians from Australia
Australian people of Greek descent
Christian missionaries in Madagascar
Australian Christian missionaries
2004 deaths
Victims of helicopter accidents or incidents
Victims of aviation accidents or incidents in Greece
Bishops of the Greek Orthodox Church of Alexandria
Year of birth missing
Australian expatriates in Madagascar
Eastern Orthodox missionaries
Greek Orthodox bishops of Madagascar